Thai-Denmark Nongrua was a female professional volleyball team based in Khonkaen, Thailand. The club was founded in 2015 and played in the Women's Volleyball Thailand League.

Honours
Pro Challenge
  Runner-up (1): 2015

Former names
 Prior to 2015 : Nongruawittaya School
 2015 – 2017 : Thai-Denmark Nongrua

Notable players
Domestic Players

 Malika Kanthong
 Chitaporn Kamlangmak
 Thitapa Tongsidee
 Phiangphit Sankaew
 Chidawan Anandamrongchai
 Nokyoong Paowana
 Patcharee Sangmuang
 Kanittha Juangjan
 Irada Poldon
 Thitima Seehorkaew
 Porntida Sawatdirak
 Sukhumarn Penboon
 Thanita Niyompon
 Cholthicha Rachwongsa
 Jidapa Kaiyasit
 Hathairat Jarat
 Tanaporn Noosatsung
 Suthida Mingmitwan 
 Panadda Thasalee
 Jurairat Ponlaka
 Suluckana Pantong
 Sopit Juabloi
 Sineenat Phocharoen
 Kaewta Noramart

References

External links
 Official fanpage

Volleyball clubs in Thailand
2015 establishments in Thailand
2017 disestablishments in Thailand
Sports clubs disestablished in 2017